A parallel college is a privately owned educational institution in Kerala (a state of India), which is not affiliated to any university, neither recognized by any, but offers training for courses following the courseware of a university unofficially. This system works in that most of the universities in Kerala allow 'private registration', in which a student can register in a university for a course and then could pursue an academic programme without being admitted to a college or a university department. Students could learn the courseware by oneself and then appear for examination at the university. These students who pursue a 'private study' do rely on parallel colleges for tuition and guidance. Such a system had become popular in Kerala because the total intake capacity of the affiliated colleges were inadequate to contain the aspirants for higher (tertiary) education.

Parallel colleges were always small scale institutions with very limited facilities. They offered training only in 'arts' (social sciences and literature) or 'commerce' faculties (BA, B.Com, MA, M.Com) and never in 'science' or 'technical' faculties. This was because science courses required lab facilities.

Demise 
Parallel colleges were very popular and were, in fact, centres of education for the masses in the 70s through 90s.They were also a source of employment for many. But by the end of the 2000s this system has come to a demise, following the state opening the higher education sector to private investors, which has caused a surge in the number of private engineering colleges and other privately owned professional colleges, which leaves many of the conventional (affiliated) degree colleges under-populated, ceasing the reason for the very existence of the parallel system.

Tutorial colleges 
Tutorial colleges are institutions similar to parallel colleges with more limited scope. While parallel colleges impart full training to its students, tutorial colleges merely supplement the lessons given by colleges or schools.

External links 

Types of university or college
Colleges in Kerala